The giant cicada (Quesada gigas), also known as the chichara grande, coyoyo, or coyuyo, is a species of large cicada native to North, Central, and South America. One of two species in the genus Quesada, it is the widest ranging cicada in the Western Hemisphere.

History 
The giant cicada was discovered by Guillaume-Antoine Olivier in 1790. British naturalist Henry Walter Bates described the shrill songs of the cicadas during his exploration in the Amazon in the late 1840s. There are historical records of the cicada in Bexar County, Texas starting in 1934, but this population died out - possibly due to the extended drought of the 1950s. Since 2005, the cicada population has grown and become widespread in central Texas. It currently ranges from central Texas to as far south as Mina Clavero, Argentina.

Description 
The giant cicada is the second largest North American cicada. Like other Texas species, the giant cicada has an appearance that camouflages it into its environment. The insects are usually a combination of black, green, and brown patterns, with brown eyes and brown to green pronotal collar color. Texas cicadas distinguish themselves by sound, rather than appearance.

Distribution and  habitat 
The giant cicada is the only species of the genus Quesada found in North America. In the United States, it primarily resides in the south Texas brushlands, which extend from the southern border to approximately Austin, Texas. Further south, it has been observed in forest parks in Brazil, and in the tropical cloud forests and rain forests in Argentina. The cicada feeds off a wide variety of plant families. As an endothermic species, the giant cicada has the ability to live in a wide range of environments.

Song 
Giant cicadas produce a remarkably distinct and loud sound, singing primarily at dusk, and less often at dawn in central Texas. It has been known to sing all day and occasionally through the night further south. Its loud, shrill song has been described as a siren or alarm, a whistle, or gas escaping a pressure release valve. Although the giant cicada resides over a large area of land, there is almost no variation in its song throughout its range.

Life cycle 
Immature giant cicadas spend at least four years underground before emerging as adults. The cicadas feed on tree roots, typically Huisache or other members of the legume family. They usually emerge between April and October in south Texas, and from June to July in central Texas.

References 

Fidicinini
Hemiptera of North America
Hemiptera of Central America
Hemiptera of South America
Insects of the United States
Insects of Mexico
Insects described in 1790